Indigo Books & Music Inc., known as "Indigo" and stylized "!ndigo", is Canada's only major English-language bookstore chain. It is Canada's largest book, gift, and specialty toy retailer, operating stores in all ten provinces and one territory, and through a website offering a selection of books, toys, home décor, stationery, and gifts. Most Chapters and Indigo stores include a Starbucks café inside.  Indigo as of 2022 has started selling music (vinyl, CDs), and select audio equipment (Headphones, turntables). 

At the end of its fiscal year in March 2018, the company reported a record annual revenue surpassing CAD $1 billion. As of July 1, 2017, the company operated 86 superstores under the banners Chapters and Indigo and 123 small format stores, under the banners Coles, Indigospirit, and The Book Company. Indigo is headquartered in Toronto, Ontario and employed more than 7,000 people throughout Canada.

After a series of mergers and acquisitions in the Canadian bookstore industry, Indigo stands as Canada's last remaining national bookstore chain. In late 2017, announcements were made to expand to the United States, starting with a location in The Mall at Short Hills.

History
The company was founded in 1996 by Heather Reisman, who is married to Gerry Schwartz, majority owner and CEO of Onex Corporation.

The company's first big-box bookstore initially called "Indigo Books, Music & More", was opened in Burlington, Ontario on September 4, 1997. With financing from Onex Corporation, Indigo bought Chapters, their largest Canadian competitor, in 2001 and continues to operate many stores under the Chapters banner. Indigo also gained the ownership of the Coles chain of small-format bookstores, which was also owned by Chapters.

Indigo closed three high-profile stores in Toronto in the spring of 2014, including the World's Biggest Bookstore, which it acquired when it bought Chapters. In June 2014, Reisman said the company was headed into a new phase, selling a much higher percentage of non-book items.

In late 2017, it was announced that it would expand to the United States, with its first location opening in The Mall at Short Hills in October 2018.

In September 2022, Reisman stepped down as CEO and became executive chair, with Peter Ruis being named CEO.

In February 2023, Indigo was the victim of a ransomware attack that rendered them unable to process non-cash transactions, returns, and gift cards for approximately two days. Online shopping remained unavailable for several days. While Indigo has assured the public that customer data was not compromised, they notified current and former employees that employee data had been. LockBit has claimed responsibility for the attack. Indigo made the decision not to pay the ransom due to the possibility that the money would be used to fund terrorism or organized crime.

Operations
The company sells books, magazines, gifts, and toys through its website and in its stores. Its banners currently include Indigo Books & Music, Chapters, Coles, SmithBooks, IndigoSpirit, and The Book Company (small format).

Indigo began a partnership with Apple and iUniverse publishing in the 2010s. Indigo also manufactures its own brand of products, called IndigoLife. In addition, the chain's Indigo Trusted Advisor Program offers book recommendations from experts in health, finance, and the environment, such as David Bach and David Suzuki.

Charitable activities
In 2004, Indigo started the Indigo Love of Reading Foundation, a program that helps provide new books and learning materials to high-needs elementary schools. Indigo commits $1.5 million annually to schools across Canada.

The money is raised by Indigo itself, customers, staff, suppliers, and proceeds from Love of Reading fundraising products (i.e., gift card sleeves). Only 80% of customer donations have been granted to over 1800 schools since the Love of Reading Foundation's inception, with Indigo covering all of the operating costs of the foundation. The funding given to the schools is split across a 90% credit to spend at Indigo and 10% cash to be spent anywhere, as long as it contributes to advancement of literacy.

In addition to the regularly collected funds, the annual Adopt a School program has increased the Indigo Love of Reading Foundation's donations up to a total of CAD 26 million given to more than 3,000 school libraries in Canada since 2004. During the month-long Adopt a School program, each retail store selects a local school to be the recipient of the donations the store collects during that time period.

In 2007, the Indigo Love of Reading Foundation produced a documentary chronicling the issue of funding for books in Canadian elementary schools. The documentary Writing on the Wall recounts the establishment of the foundation, while revealing the current conditions of school libraries and literacy in Canada.  A follow up documentary was created in 2017 titled "Read Between the Lines".

Kobo Inc.
Kobo Inc., an e-reader platform and manufacturer, was founded and spun off of Indigo in November 2009. By August 2011, the Kobo e-reading platform had become the dominant player in Canada, with research firm Ipsos Reid estimating that it represented 36% of the Canadian market as of that date.

In November 2011, Japanese ecommerce company Rakuten purchased the company for US$315 million in cash. Around 58% of Kobo was owned by Indigo at the time of the purchase.

Employee programs
Indigo was listed as one of Canada's Top 20 Employer Brands in the 2018 survey by Randstad Holding. This is due in part to staff rewards program which includes benefits eligibility for both full-time and part-time employees.  Indigo also offers a company-matched RRSP program and yearly employee scholarships.

Criticism and controversies

Product removal
In 2001, Indigo removed Adolf Hitler's Mein Kampf from the shelves. In 2006, Indigo decided not to sell the June issue of Harper's Magazine, which reprinted the controversial cartoons of the Muslim prophet Muhammad that had led to violent demonstrations around the world. Indigo also did not distribute the issue of Western Standard which reprinted and discussed those same cartoons. The company has also reportedly refused to stock several titles by David Icke, and firearms magazines.

Support of Israel by owners
In the summer of 2006, the company was targeted by social activists from NION and the Coalition Against Israeli Apartheid. According to a report in This Magazine, CAIA advocated the boycott of Chapters/Indigo stores due to principals Reisman and Schwartz forming the Heseg Foundation for soldiers serving in the Israeli army that have no family living in the state of Israel. The article claimed Reisman and Schwartz donate $3 million a year to the Foundation.

Competitive position
The Indigo/Chapters chain has been criticized over what some perceive as a virtual monopoly over retail-based book sales in Canada. In 2002, the company strongly opposed the entry of Amazon into the Canadian marketplace with accusations the U.S.-based company was skirting regulations about foreign ownership of Canadian booksellers.

Indigo's expansion has been blamed, among other factors, for the financial difficulties of some independent booksellers in Canada. In particular, its rise coincided with the bankruptcy of Lichtman's, once Canada's largest independent bookseller.

See also

 Publishing

References

External links

 
 Indigo Love of Reading Foundation website
 Canadian Encyclopedia: Chapters Bid
 
 Publishers Weekly: Heather Reisman: "Cautiously, Respectfully Bullish"

 
Canadian brands
Companies based in Toronto
 Companies listed on the Toronto Stock Exchange
Retail companies established in 1996
 Bookstores established in the 20th century
 Music retailers of Canada